Swankamore is a community in Congo Town, Greater Monrovia District, Liberia. The community is located SKD Boulevard.

As of 2014 the population of Key & Death Hole was estimated at 5,036. Swankamore is part of the Montserrado-5 electoral district.

As of 2018 there were reports of plans for the construction of a Hilton Hotel in the community.

References

Communities of the Greater Monrovia District